Phospholysine phosphohistidine inorganic pyrophosphate phosphatase is a protein that in humans is encoded by the LHPP gene.

References

Further reading